John Patrick Reinheimer (born July 19, 1992) is an American professional baseball shortstop for the Gastonia Honey Hunters of the Atlantic League of Professional Baseball. He played college baseball at East Carolina University and played in Major League Baseball (MLB) for the Arizona Diamondbacks and New York Mets.

Career

Amateur
Reinheimer was drafted by the Atlanta Braves in the 31st round of the 2010 Major League Baseball draft out of Ardrey Kell High School in Charlotte, North Carolina. He did not sign with the Braves and attended East Carolina University to play college baseball. In 2012, he played collegiate summer baseball with the Bourne Braves of the Cape Cod Baseball League.

Seattle Mariners
He was drafted by the Seattle Mariners in the fifth round of the 2013 MLB Draft. He signed and spent 2013 with the Everett AquaSox where he batted .269 with two home runs and 30 RBIs in 66 games. In 2014, he played for the Clinton LumberKings and High Desert Mavericks, posting a combined .276 batting average with three home runs, 58 RBIs, and 39 stolen bases in 130 total games between both teams. He started 2015 with the Jackson Generals.

Arizona Diamondbacks
On June 3, 2015 the Mariners traded Reinheimer along with Dominic Leone, Welington Castillo and Gabby Guerrero to the Arizona Diamondbacks for Mark Trumbo and Vidal Nuño. Arizona assigned him to the Mobile BayBears and he finished the season there. In 124 total games between Jackson and Mobile, he slashed .270/.342/.363 with five home runs and 42 RBIs. Reinheimer spent 2016 with the Reno Aces where he compiled a .288 batting average with two home runs and 48 RBIs in 132 games. The Diamondbacks added him to their 40-man roster after the 2016 season. He began 2017 with Reno. Reinheimer made his MLB debut on August 2, 2017.

New York Mets
He was claimed off waivers by the New York Mets on July 31, 2018.

Reinheimer recorded his first Major League hit on August 15 against Cody Carroll of the Baltimore Orioles at Camden Yards.

Baltimore Orioles
On November 2, 2018, he was claimed off waivers by the Chicago Cubs. On November 20, he was claimed by the Texas Rangers. On January 28, 2019, he was claimed by the Baltimore Orioles. The Orioles assigned him to Triple-A Norfolk Tides. He became a free agent following the 2019 season.

Minnesota Twins
On December 20, 2019, Reinheimer signed a minor league deal with the Minnesota Twins. Reinheimer was released by the Twins organization on September 4, 2020.

Return to the Seattle Mariners
On February 1, 2021, Reinheimer signed a minor league deal with an invitation to Spring Training with his original team, the Seattle Mariners. He became a free agent following the season.

Gastonia Honey Hunters
On February 25, 2022, Reinheimer signed with the Gastonia Honey Hunters of the Atlantic League of Professional Baseball.

References

External links

East Carolina Pirates bio

1992 births
Living people
Baseball players from Charlotte, North Carolina
Major League Baseball infielders
Arizona Diamondbacks players
New York Mets players
East Carolina Pirates baseball players
Everett AquaSox players
Clinton LumberKings players
High Desert Mavericks players
Jackson Generals (Southern League) players
Mobile BayBears players
Salt River Rafters players
Reno Aces players
Las Vegas 51s players
Tacoma Rainiers players
Bourne Braves players
Gastonia Honey Hunters players